Dordives is a commune in the Loiret department in north-central France. Dordives station has rail connections to Montargis, Melun and Paris.

See also
 Communes of the Loiret department

References

Communes of Loiret
Orléanais